Henrik Böhm (10 April 1867 – 23 October 1936) was a Hungarian Jewish architect who worked in the secessionist style.

Life and works 

After attending schools in Székesfehérvár and Budapest, Böhm earned a degree in architecture from the Budapest University of Technology in 1890. After a long study trip, he then settled in Budapest. His main works:
 New town hall, Újpest (1899)
  (1905-1906)
 Casino in Čakovec, Croatia
 Újpestvidéki Takarékpénztár in Újpest

He also excelled in funerary architecture: he designed several tombs in the Rákoskeresztúr cemetery.

References
 "SZEMÉLYNÉV: Böhm Henrik". in: Péter Ujvári. . 1929.

External links

Hungarian architects
1867 births
1936 deaths